Terret or Terrets may be a reference to:

 Terret, part of a horse harness
 Terret (grape)
 Tourette syndrome, a neurological disorder
 Terete, adjective meaning cylindrical with a tapering end or ends
 Terets (gunboat), an Imperial Russian gunboat